The following is a glossary of terms used in tables games, essentially games played on a Backgammon-type board. Terms in this glossary should not be game-specific (e.g. specific to a single game like Backgammon or Acey-deucey), but applicable to a range of tables games.

A 
  ace
 A die roll of one.
 The face of a die with one pip. (Historically, 2=deuce, 3=trey, 4=quater, 5=cinc, 6=sice; though these terms are now obsolete.)

  ace point
 The player's first point on the board. Also home point or one point.

B 
  bar
 The central strip separating the left and right halves of the board, usually formed by the raised edges or rails of each half board. The raised partition of the board.

  bear off
 To remove one's men from the board in the final stages of a game. The first to do so usually wins the game; however, in Trictrac, it scores points but the game continues. Also throw off or take off.

  bearing table
 The table in which men are borne off.

  block
 Any point on the board where two or more men rest. An opponent may not land on such a point.

  blockade
 A succession of blocked points i.e. points held by at least two men. Also prime.

  blot
 A single man on a point. In many tables games, this is a vulnerable situation as the man is liable to be hit by an opposing man.

  board
 The whole playing area, traditionally a hinged, wooden tray.
 Same as quadrant. Thus there are four boards. In Backgammon and similar games, there is a home board and outer board on each player's side.

  break a point
 To remove one of two men on a point, thus leaving a blot. Also clear a point.

  builder
 Once two men have been placed on a point, any extra men are builders.

C 
  cast
 The number rolled on a die or dice.
 To throw or roll the die or dice.

  checker
 US backgammon term for any of the pieces used for playing the game. Also counter, man or stone.

  cinque
 A die roll of five
 The face of a die with five pips.

  closed point, closed space
 Usually, a point or space that is occupied by two or more opposing men.
 In some games, a point or space that is occupied by exactly two opposing men. See Nard.

  cocked die
 A die that comes to rest tilted and not flat. May be automatically invalid in some games.

  come in, come on
 To bring a man back into play, after it has been hit or knocked off.

  contrary movement
 A game of contrary movement is one in which the players move their pieces in opposing directions. Examples: Backgammon, Trictrac.

  counter
 Any one of the pieces used for playing the game. Also checker (US), man or stone.

  cover a blot
 To place a second man on an isolated piece thus making a point.

  cup
 The container used to throw the dice or die. Should have a small lip on the inside to prevent fixing the dice. Also dice cup.

D 
  dice cup
 A cup used to shake and roll the dice.

  die, dice
 A die is one of usually two or three six-sided cubes used in playing a tables game. Each face of the cube is marked with a number of pips from 1 to 6 that is used in moving men or scoring. Plural: dice.

  division
 Same as quadrant.

  doubles
 See doublet.

  doublet
 Two dice each with the same pip count. In some tables games, the player plays each die twice. Also doubles. 
 In French tables games, there were individual names for the doublets as follows:
 doublet of Aces: bezas (diminutive of ambesas), bezet;
 doublet of 2: double two (doublet de deux);
 doublet of 3: ternes;
 doublet of 4: carmes;
 doublet of 5: quines;
 doublet of 6: sonnez ("ring the bells").

  doubling cube, doubling die
 An extra and slightly larger die used especially in modern Backgammon to raise the game value or stakes on the game. Marked with the numerals 2, 4, 8, 16, 32 and 64.

E 
  enter
 To play a piece onto the tables or board.

  expose a blot, expose a point
 See uncover a blot.

  exposed
 Said of a man that sits alone on a point. In most games he is vulnerable to being hit by an opposing man.

G 
  gammon
 A game in which the loser has failed to bear off any pieces. It is worth double.

H 
  hit
 In hitting games, to force an isolated opposing piece (or blot) off the board by moving a piece to the point concerned e.g. as in Backgammon. Also 'knock off'.
 To score points by being in a position to move a piece to a point on which an isolated opposing piece is located e.g. as in Trictrac.

  hitting game
 A game in which hitting a blot is permitted. Examples: Backgammon and Portes.

  home
 noun. The first point on a player's side.
 noun. The starting or finishing point.
 adverb. To the player's first six points.
 To play at home. To play one's pieces in one's first twelve points.

  home board, home table
 That quadrant of the board containing a player's points 1 to 6. Also inner board or inner table.  Sometimes also called the finishing quadrant or bearing table.

  home point
 See ace point.

  homewards
 Towards the player's first point.

I 
  inner board, inner table
 See home board.

K 
  knock off
 See hit.

M 
  march
 The route of one or more men around the board.

  man, men
 Any of the counters used to play a tables game. Formerly table-man. Man is the traditional English term, but it is also called a checker (US), counter, piece or stone.

  move
 The action of advancing a man in accordance with the roll of a die. If a man is advanced by the total score on two dice, it is a double move.

O 
 off the board
 Placed anywhere that is not on the playing surface. Where a man is sent when hit.

  open point, open space
 Usually, a point or space that is not occupied by two or more opposing men.
 In some games, point or space that is not occupied by exactly two men. See Nard.

 outer board, outer table
 The penultimate quadrant of the board, preceding the player's home table or inner table.

P 
  parallel movement
 A game of parallel movement is one in which the players move their pieces in the same direction around the board. Examples: Fevga, Jacquet, Narde, Moultezim.

  piece
 Any of the counters used in tables games. Also checker, man or stone. Man is the traditional term.

  pile
 A stack of two or more men on a point.
 To place men one on top of another. 

  pin, pinning, pinning a blot
 In pinning games, to move a piece onto a point containing a single enemy man thus preventing it from further movement.

  pinning game
 A game in which pinning a blot is permitted. Example: Plakoto.

  pip, pips
 The spots on the dice.

  play
 To move a man based on the roll of a die or dice.

  point, make a point, make the point
 Any one of the triangular spaces on a tables board.
 To make a point is to establish two or more men on it such that it cannot be captured.

  prime
 A succession of blocked points, normally points held by at least two opposing men.{ Also blockade.
 A succession of six points so occupied. Also side prime.

Q 
  quadrant
 One of the four sections of a tables board. Also board, division, quarter or table.

  quarter
 Same as quadrant.

R 
  rail
 Same as off the board. The rail is the raised edge of the board.

  re-enter
 To play a man to the board after it has been removed, typically after being hit.

  rest
 A man is said to 'rest' when he pauses on an intermediate point in moving the total of two or more dice.

  roll the die, roll the dice
 To project or throw the die or dice onto the board. Also cast or throw.

  running game
 A game in which there is no hitting or pinning and players 'race' around the board in the same direction. Example: Fevga. See also games of parallel movement.

S 
  setting the men
 To place the men in position at the start of a game.

  side prime
 A blockade of six consecutive points. See also prime.

  singleton
 A single man on a point; also called a blot.

  space
 One of usually 24 rectangular sections of a tables board, especially an historical one, one which men may be placed during play. Equivalent of point q.v.

  stack
 To place men one on top of one another. Also pile.
 A heap of men so placed. Also pile.

  stone
 See man.

T 

  table
 Same as quadrant. One of the four divisions of the board.
 Sometimes used to describe each half of the board (left and right).

  tableman, tablemen, table-man, table-men
 Original name for the pieces or men, q.v.

   Tables board
 The playing surface of a tables game.

  Tables game
 A game played using a tables board.

  talon
 Point no. 1 in French tables games such as Trictrac and Jacquet.

  throw
 Same as roll when referring to dice.
 Throw off. Same as bear off.

  trictrac, Trictrac board
 Type of board used for Trictrac and other French tables games. Similar to a backgammon board, but with high side rails and holes in the rails for scoring purposes. 

  triplet
 Three dice each with the same pip count.

U 
  uncover a blot, uncover a point
 To remove a man or men from a point leaving only one man behind, who is thus exposed.

Footnotes

References

Literature 
 Bell, R. C. (1979). Board and Table Games from Many Civilizations. NY: Dover. 
 Clay, Robin A. (1992). Backgammon. London: Hodder.
 Crane, Michael (2006). Backgammon. London: Teach Yourself.
 Forgeng, Jeff, Dorothy Johnston and David Cram (2003). Francis Willughby's Book of Games. Ashgate Press. .
 Halliwell-Phillips, James Orchard (1852). A Dictionary of Archaic & Provincial Words, Obsolete Phrases, Proverbs and Ancient Customs, Volume 2 (J–Z). London: John Russell Smith.
 Jacoby, Oswald and John R. Crawford (1970). The Backgammon Book. NY: Vikong.
 Longacre, John (1980). Backgammon of Today. NY: Bell.
 
 Murray, H. J. R. (1941). "“The Mediaeval Games of Tables" in Medium Aevum, Vol. 10, ed. by Charles Talbot Onions. Society for the Study of Mediæval Languages and Literature. pp. 57-69.  
 Obolensky, Prince Alexis and Ted James (1974). Backgammon. London: Star. [Originally publ. as Backgammon: The Action Game, NY: Collier (1969) and London: Allen (1971).]
 
 Singman, Jeffrey L. (1999). Daily Life in Medieval Europe. Westport: Greenwood.

External links 
 Glossary of the US Backgammon Federation.

Tables games

 
Wikipedia glossaries using description lists